Epinotia pinicola is a species of moth of the family Tortricidae. It is found in China (Henan, Sichuan), Korea, Japan and Russia.

The wingspan is 13–16 mm.

The larvae feed on Pinus pumila.

References

Moths described in 1970
Eucosmini